Parnkalla may refer to:
Parnkalla people
Parnkalla language
Parnkalla (cicada), a genus of cicadas